Max Pirkis (born 6 January 1989) is an English actor. After appearing in two stage productions during the mid-2000s, Pirkis made his film debut in Master and Commander: The Far Side of the World (2003), after the film crew recruited him at his school, Eton College. In a critically praised performance, he won the Evening Standard British Film Award for Most Promising Newcomer and the Young Artist Award for Best Young Actor in an International Film. Two years later, he was cast in the BBC/HBO television series Rome as Gaius Octavian, a role he held until 2007.

Early life and education
Pirkis was born in London on 6 January 1989. His mother is a publisher, and he has a sister. After being educated at Eton College, Pirkis began attending St Catharine's College, Cambridge, where he read Theology and was captain of the college's football team, in 2009.

Career

Master and Commander
Pirkis started his acting in school plays while attending Eton, though he never took them seriously. Although unsure what he wanted to do with his life, Pirkis was cast for his first professional role in 2002, when he appeared in the successful film, Master and Commander: The Far Side of the World. The hire occurred after production staff visited Eton to hire boys for the ship's teenage crew. Pirkis attended a workshop and auditions as "a joke", ultimately securing the part of the 13-year-old, eventually one-armed midshipman Lord Blakeney of HMS Surprise. Director Peter Weir thought Pirkis "stood out very early on, but not to the extent that you see in the film. That was a complete surprise." According to Pirkis, he was at first "nervous" about acting with Russell Crowe, but changed his mind when he realised that Crowe was "a pretty normal guy."

One of four teenage actors chosen for the film, Pirkis began researching the history of the Royal Navy and the Napoleonic Wars to prepare himself for the role, before ultimately spending six months shooting the film. Weir soon discovered that Pirkis had "an old actor's soul in his body," and consequently gave him more acting challenges. Because his character loses an arm, Pirkis wore a prosthetic stump on set; tucking his real arm to the side, he practised how to write and eat using only his left arm. Pirkis completed the amputation scene in two takes, thinking of the death of a family friend for inspiration.

Soon after being cast in Master and Commander, Pirkis was contracted to be represented by Hollywood talent agency ICM. The income he earned for the film was placed into a bank, making him wait until he turned eighteen. For his role, Pirkis received critical acclaim and won the Evening Standard British Film Award for Most Promising Newcomer and the Young Artist Award for Best International Performance by a Young Actor at the 25th Young Artist Awards. Pirkis was also nominated for Best Performance by a Youth in a Lead or Supporting Role – Male at the 4th Phoenix Film Critics Society Awards. Jeremiah Kipp of Slant Magazine praised Pirkis, writing that he "makes a winning impression as midshipman Lord Blakeney, a pugnacious one-armed lad who imitates the masculine bravado of Crowe and the bookish reserve of Bettany."

Rome
In 2005, Pirkis made his television debut. Until 2007, Pirkis played Gaius Octavian (later to become Caesar Augustus) in the BBC/HBO television series Rome. Many critics highlighted Pirkis and his character for praise. At the beginning of the first season, The Washington Post columnist Tom Shales remarked: "Played both knowingly and innocently by Max Pirkis, he gives the audience something it desperately needs... a character to root for, or at least care about." During the second series, Pirkis was replaced by Simon Woods in order for the show to depict an older version of the character.

Embankment Films
In February 2016, Pirkis was appointed head of acquisitions and distribution at Embankment Films.

Filmography

See also

 List of Old Etonians born in the 20th century
 List of accolades received by Master and Commander: The Far Side of the World

References

External links

1989 births
Living people
People educated at Eton College
English male film actors
English male television actors
English male child actors
Male actors from London
Alumni of St Catharine's College, Cambridge